Point of Pines is a populated place situated on the San Carlos Apache Indian Reservation in Graham County, Arizona, United States.

References

Populated places in Graham County, Arizona